Piñera is a Hispanic surname. Notable people with the surname include:
Piñera family
Bernardino Piñera (1915–2020), Chilean prelate of the Catholic Church
José Piñera Carvallo (1917–1991), Chilean engineer, diplomat and politician. His sons include:
José Piñera (born 1948), Chilean economist
Miguel Piñera (born 1954), Chilean celebrity
Sebastián Piñera (born 1949), Chilean businessman and President (2010–2014, 2018-2022)

Others
Antonia Is Piñera (born 1966), Spanish football defender
Eva Piñera (born 1974), Spanish swimmer 
Gerardo Carrera Piñera (born 1987), Spanish football player
Isma Piñera (born 1977), Spanish football player
Juan Piñera (born 1949), Cuban musician
Mike Pinera (born 1948), American guitarist
Virgilio Piñera (1912–1979), Cuban author

Spanish-language surnames